Kim Kih-hoon (born 1975) is a South Korean film director and screenwriter. Kim's first theatrical film The Mode of Disappearance (2005), tells the story of a man who one day finds his face has changed unrecognizably. The film debuted at the Busan International Film Festival and was invited to other major short film festivals including the Clermont-Ferrand International Short Film Festival in France where it was highly received. His directorial feature debut The Boy from Ipanema (2010), won the Audience Critic's Award and Movie Collage Award at the 11th Jeonju International Film Festival in 2010. Currently working on his latest work Trot (2015), it will star Ahn Sung-ki and Joo Sang-wook.

Filmography 
The Mode of Disappearance (short film, 2005) - director, screenwriter
The Way of Calling Nietzsche (documentary short, 2006) - director, screenwriter, producer, cinematographer, editor 
The Boy from Ipanema (2010) - director, screenwriter, editor, executive producer, planner
Trot (2015) - director

References

External links 
 
 
 

1975 births
Living people
South Korean film directors
South Korean screenwriters